Fjelberg is a former municipality in the old Hordaland county, Norway.  The municipality existed from 1838 until 1965 when it was dissolved. In 1965, the municipality covered , mostly islands and a small area on the mainland.  It encompassed part of what is now Kvinnherad Municipality (in Vestland county) and Vindafjord Municipality (in Rogaland county), primarily the islands of Fjelbergøya, Borgundøya, and Halsnøya, as well as some surrounding areas on the mainland.  The administrative centre of the municipality was the small village located on the island of Fjelbergøya where Fjelberg Church is located.

History
The parish of Fjældberg was established as a formannskapsdistrikt on 1 January 1838. According to the 1835 census the parish had a population of 2,986 at the time.  In 1855, the neighboring municipality of Eid was incorporated into Fjelberg, increasing its population to 4,794. 

In 1865, the parish of Vikebygd (population: 1,062) in the southwestern part of the municipality was separated from Fjelberg and merged with a part of neighboring Finnaas Municipality to create the new Sveen Municipality. On 1 January 1898, the southern part of the island of Huglo (population: 117) was transferred from Fjelberg to the neighboring Stord Municipality.  On 1 July 1916, the southern (mainland) part of Fjelberg (population: 1,715) was split off to form the new Ølen Municipality, leaving Fjelberg with 1,926 inhabitants.  

On 1 January 1965, as part of the nationwide merging of municipalities as suggested by the Schei Committee, Fjelberg municipality was dissolved.  Fjelberg municipality was merged with neighboring Kvinnherad Municipality, part of Skånevik Municipality, and most of Varaldsøy Municipality to form the new (much larger) Kvinnherad Municipality.  Prior to the merger, Fjelberg had a population of 2,308, and after the merger, the new municipality had nearly 10,000 residents.

Government

Municipal council
The municipal council  of Fjelberg was made up of 21 representatives that were elected to four year terms.  The party breakdown of the final municipal council was as follows:

See also
List of former municipalities of Norway

References

Kvinnherad
Vindafjord
Former municipalities of Norway
1838 establishments in Norway
1965 disestablishments in Norway